Levi Augustus Mackey (November 25, 1819 – February 8, 1889) was a United States representative from Pennsylvania.

Mackey was born in White Deer Township, Union County, Pennsylvania. In 1837, he graduated from Union College in Schenectady, New York, with Phi Beta Kappa honors and membership in The Kappa Alpha Society, before studying law at Dickinson College in Carlisle, Pennsylvania.

From 1841 until 1855, Mackey practiced law in Lock Haven, Pennsylvania.  He then served as the president of Lock Haven Bank and as president of the Bald Eagle Valley Railroad.

Mackey served as a delegate to the 1852 Whig National Convention and to the 1872 Democratic National Convention.  He campaigned, unsuccessfully, for a seat in the 41st United States Congress in 1868 but was elected mayor of Lock Haven in 1870.  From March 4, 1875 to March 3, 1879 he served as a Democratic U.S. Representative to the Forty-fourth and 45th United States Congresses, representing the 20th District of Pennsylvania.

He died in Lock Haven, Pennsylvania, February 8, 1889, and was interred at Highland Cemetery in Lock Haven.

Sources
 
 The Political Graveyard

Pennsylvania lawyers
American bankers
American railroad executives
Union College (New York) alumni
1819 births
1889 deaths
Democratic Party members of the United States House of Representatives from Pennsylvania
19th-century American politicians
People from Union County, Pennsylvania
19th-century American lawyers
19th-century American businesspeople